Total Guitar is a monthly music magazine based in Bath, the United Kingdom, that has been in circulation since 1994.

The magazine is owned by Future plc, who publish many other magazines ranging from drums and video games to technology magazines.

Total Guitar regularly contains tablature for rock, acoustic, punk, blues, and metal, as well as profiles of guitarists and their specific techniques and playing styles. Total Guitar is aimed at players who would like to learn how to play guitar and people who would like to develop their playing style, with tutorials in acoustic and electric guitar.

Total Guitar also has an gear reviews section that looks at the latest guitar equipment. It also has interviews with guitarists from all genres and levels of playing, and has an in-depth features section.

The Learn To Play section of Total Guitar covers songs from beginner level through to intermediate. The magazine also comes with a free CD in each issue that contains backing tracks and demonstration tracks to accompany the magazine's tablature. The magazine has also featured a DVD edition in two of the issues.

2010's line-up of Guest Lesson columnists so far for Total Guitar include Australian fingerstyle player Tommy Emmanuel, blues player Joe Bonamassa and metal guitarist Zakk Wylde. There have been guest spots from various other popular guitarists in Total Guitar over the years, such as Brian Setzer, Joe Trohman of Fall Out Boy, Mick Thompson and Jim Root of Slipknot, John 5, Synyster Gates and Zacky Vengeance of Avenged Sevenfold, Alex Skolnick, Mark Tremonti, of Alter Bridge, Marty Friedman, Joe Satriani, Wes Borland, Matt Tuck and Michael Paget of BFMV, and Matt Heafy and Corey Beaulieu of Trivium.

The magazine celebrated its 200th issue in April 2010, with Jimi Hendrix on the cover.

Personnel
The magazine's current team is:
 Associate Editor - Stuart Williams
 Managing Editor - Lucy Rice
 Features Editor - Rob Laing
 Music Editor - Chris Bird
 Staff writer - Matt Parker
 Art Editor - John Blackshaw
 Deputy Art Editor - Leanne O'Hara

Notes

External links
 

1994 establishments in the United Kingdom
Guitar magazines
Magazines established in 1994
Mass media in Bath, Somerset
Monthly magazines published in the United Kingdom
Music magazines published in the United Kingdom